Mlungisi Mbunjana (born 26 August 1990) is a South African soccer player who plays as a midfielder for South African Premier Division side TS Galaxy.

References

Living people
1990 births
South African soccer players
Association football midfielders
Cape Town All Stars players
Highlands Park F.C. players
TS Galaxy F.C. players
South African Premier Division players
National First Division players